Centennial is an unincorporated community in Millcreek Township, Fountain County, Indiana, United States.

Centennial was the name of a church in Mill Creek Township, that was so named from it being established on the centenary of its denomination.

Geography

References

Unincorporated communities in Fountain County, Indiana
Unincorporated communities in Indiana